Wade Rothery (born 7 June 1977) is an Australian former professional rugby league footballer, best known for playing with the Balmain Tigers during the 1999 NRL season. Prior to this, Rothery played for the Brisbane Broncos reserve side in the 1997 Super League competition.

Rothery's time playing for the Balmain Tigers came to an end when he sustained a knee injury. From 2000 onwards, he played for the Central Comets in the Queensland Rugby League's Queensland Cup competition. Rothery announced his retirement in 2005 following a 52-10 loss to Easts Tigers. However, he relocated to the Sunshine Coast the following year when he was recruited by local club Caloundra Sharks in 2006. In 2007, Rothery made the move over to another local Sunshine Coast club, the Beerwah Hinterland Bulldogs.

In October 2017, it was announced that Rothery had been selected as the One Nation candidate for the seat of Rockhampton to contest the 2017 Queensland state election. The announcement ended several days of speculation in the local media during which several Central Queensland rugby league identities were named as possibly being the mystery former professional rugby league footballer until One Nation leader Pauline Hanson confirmed the endorsed candidate. The speculated candidates included Guy Williams, Scott Minto and PJ Marsh. Rothery also stood as the One Nation candidate for the electorate of Capricornia, where he attained 16.98% of the primary vote, but ultimately lost to Michelle Landry of the Coalition.

Wade Rothery is a brother of fellow rugby league player Alan Rothery.

References 

1977 births
Living people
Balmain Tigers players
Australian rugby league players
Rugby league wingers
Rugby league players from Rockhampton, Queensland